Aérea Negrot is a Venezuelan singer, electronic musician and remixer. She lives in Berlin, Germany. Her name is inspired by her fascination about travels and planes and her admiration for the voices of Toña La Negra and Olga Guillot.
Her music is a pastiche of electronica, techno, cabaret and pop. She's also part of Hercules & Love Affair, and sings on several tracks of their second album Blue Songs. Her debut album, Arabxilla (2011), was released on BPitch Control.

Discography

Albums

EPs/singles
 2010 – "All I Wanna Do" (Bpitch Control) additional remixes by Efdemin and tobias.
 2011 – "Right Body Wrong Time" (Bpitch Control)
 2011 – "It's Lover, Love" (Bpitch Control) additional remixes by Villalobos, Philip Bader, Kiki, Fata Kiefer and Dance Disorder.

Remixes
 2011 – Shaun J. Wright – "Forever More" (Aérea Negrot Remix) (Mr. INTL)

Compilations
 2004 – V.V.A.A. – FEA Versión Dosmilcuatro include LaFamiliaFeliz feat. Aérea Negrot – La Disco (Sinnamon Records)
 2010 – Ellen Allien – Watergate 05 include All I Wanna Do (Watergate Records)
 2010 – V.V.A.A. – Ich Bin Ein Berliner include Ich Bin Dein Mädchen (Araknid Records)
 2010 – V.V.A.A. – Saturator 4xuRODZINY include Ich Bin Dein Mädchen (Saturator)
 2011 – V.V.A.A. – Werkschau include Deutsche Werden (Bpitch Control)
 2011 – V.V.A.A. – Groove 132 / CD 41 include Arabxilla (Groove)
 2011 – V.V.A.A. – Spex No. 99 include Berlin (Spex Magazine)

Vocals/collaborations
 2009 – Massimiliano Pagliara – Sensation 9 (Original Mix) (Rush Hour Recordings)
 2010 – Hercules And Love Affair – Blue Songs (Moshi Moshi Records)
 2011 – tobias. – Leaning Over Backwards (Ostgut Ton)

References

External links
 Biography at BPitch Control
 Biography at The Guardian
 Hercules And Love Affair
 Complot Magazine interview (in Spanish)

21st-century Venezuelan women singers
Venezuelan emigrants to Germany
Living people
BPitch Control artists
Hercules and Love Affair members
Year of birth missing (living people)
Women in electronic music